The Municipality of the County of Antigonish is a county municipality in Nova Scotia, Canada. It provides local government to the eponymous historical county, except for the Town of Antigonish, and two reserves: Pomquet and Afton 23, and Summerside 38.

The municipality provides public works services such as rubbish collection, road works, fresh water, and wastewater.

History
Antigonish is from the Miꞌkmaq language and the meaning is uncertain. The first humans arrived in the area about 2500 years ago. Acadian colonists arrived in the early 1700s before being deported when the territory changed hands from the French Ancien Régime to the Kingdom of Great Britain. In the 1770s Scottish emigrants of the Highland Clearances arrived. Following the American Revolutionary War, United Empire Loyalists arrived. In second half of the 1800s, St. Francis Xavier University opened, and railways, telephones, electric lighting came to the area. At this point the population was close to what it is today.

It was incorporated as a county municipality in 1879 with the town of Antigonish incorporating as a separate municipality 10 years later.

See also
List of historic places in Antigonish County

References

External links
Municipality of the County of Antigonish

 
Antigonish
1785 establishments in Nova Scotia